Luan Michel de Louzã, simply known as Luan (born 21 September 1988) is a Brazilian professional footballer who plays as a forward for Portuguesa.

Career
Born in Araras, Luan has played in Brazil and France for União São João, São Caetano, Toulouse and Palmeiras.

References

1988 births
Living people
People from Araras
Association football forwards
Brazilian footballers
Campeonato Brasileiro Série A players
Campeonato Brasileiro Série B players
União São João Esporte Clube players
Associação Desportiva São Caetano players
Sociedade Esportiva Palmeiras players
Cruzeiro Esporte Clube players
Club Athletico Paranaense players
Red Bull Brasil players
América Futebol Clube (MG) players
Ligue 1 players
Toulouse FC players
UAE Pro League players
Sharjah FC players
Sport Club do Recife players
Sport Club Atibaia players
Associação Portuguesa de Desportos players
Brazilian expatriate footballers
Brazilian expatriate sportspeople in France
Brazilian expatriate sportspeople in the United Arab Emirates
Expatriate footballers in France
Expatriate footballers in the United Arab Emirates
Footballers from São Paulo (state)